SS Canadian Mariner was a freighter built by Halifax Shipyards Ltd in 1920. She was the first steel ship built in Halifax and was used as a general cargo ship until she was sunk in the Pacific in 1942.

Early life 
The Canadian government commissioned the building of 63 ships in 1918 in an effort to start a crown funded shipping company, Canadian Government Merchant Marine Ltd. Canadian Mariner was built as the result of the two contracts awarded to Halifax Shipyards Ltd by the Canadian Government. The other contract was for her sister ship, .

Transfer history
In 1928 management of Canadian Mariner was transferred from the failed Canadian Government Merchant Marine Ltd to Canadian National Steamship Company, which she steamed under until 1933 when she was eventually sold to Dairen Kisen KK of Japan to be used as a general cargo and supply vessel for the Japanese occupied Pacific Islands under the name Choyo Maru.

Fate 

Partial list of voyages
 December 8, 1920 : Halifax to Genoa
 June 16, 1921 : Montreal to Liverpool
 July 23, 1921 : Montreal to Australia

References

Ships built in Nova Scotia
1920 ships
Merchant ships of Canada
Merchant ships of Japan
World War II merchant ships of Japan
Maritime incidents in December 1942
World War II shipwrecks in the East China Sea